Kim Dae-joong (born 13 October 1992) is a South Korean footballer who plays for Incheon United.

References

External links 
 

1992 births
Living people
South Korean footballers
K League 1 players
Daejeon Hana Citizen FC players
Incheon United FC players
Gimcheon Sangmu FC players
Association football defenders